The President's Mystery is a 1936 American film directed by Phil Rosen.

The film is also known as One for All in the United Kingdom.

Plot summary 
The film deals with a "problem Mr. Roosevelt submitted . . . whether it was possible for a man, weary of faithless friends and a wasted life, to convert a $5,000,000 estate into cash, disappear and start anew in some worth-while activity." (cited from The New York Times – Monday, April 16, 2012)

Disillusioned attorney James Blake is engaged by his friend George Sartos to lobby on behalf of the National Cannery against a bill that would've empowered smaller businesses. After James is successful, he encounters Charlotte Brown, who runs a cannery that is the main livelihood of the small town of Springvale; the cannery has been forced to close because of the bill. James listens to the townsfolk and is inspired to help them.

James liquidates his assets, closes his bank accounts, and stages a failed business venture to make it seem that he's gone bankrupt. Once ready, he leaves his estranged wife, Ilka, to fake his death in a car accident. Ilka tries to inform George, who is also her lover, about James's strange behavior but is accidentally killed by George's manservant, Andrew. James learns about Ilka's death through the radio, and how James is blamed for it but the case is considered closed since his "body" was found by the police.

Some months later James, using his new name James Carter, is in a relationship with Charlotte and has turned her cannery into a success. They are visited by George, who wants to buy out their business. George recognizes James and tries to blackmail him into compliance. When James refuses, George informs the police and James is arrested for Ilka's murder.

While James is held in the town jail, George plants agents provocateurs to cause a riot to destroy the cannery. James learns of this and, due to his good relationship with the people of Springvale, is allowed out of the town jail to talk the rioters down and bring proof of his intentions to keep the cannery going. Meanwhile, James's former manservant Roger, acting on his own initiative, finds out from Andrew that Ilka's death was an accident. George is arrested for causing the riot, and James is released, freeing him to marry Charlotte.

Cast 
Henry Wilcoxon as James Blake
Betty Furness as Charlotte Brown
Sidney Blackmer as George Sartos
Evelyn Brent as Ilka Blake
Barnett Parker as Roger
Mel Ruick as Andrew
Wade Boteler as Sheriff
John Wray as Shane
Guy Usher as Police Lieutenant
Robert Homans as Sergeant
Si Jenks as Earl
Arthur Aylesworth as Joe Reed

External links 

1936 films
American mystery films
American black-and-white films
Republic Pictures films
Franklin D. Roosevelt
Films produced by Nat Levine
1936 mystery films
Films directed by Phil Rosen
1930s English-language films
1930s American films